Csáfordjánosfa is a village in Győr-Moson-Sopron county, Hungary.

External links 
 Street map 

Populated places in Győr-Moson-Sopron County